Keke Covers is cover album by American R&B recording artist Keke Wyatt. It was released on February 14, 2017, through Aratek Entertainment.

The album features covers from Mary J. Blige's cover of Rose Royce, Beyoncé, Jeremih, Prince and The New Power Generation, Rihanna, Zayn, Whitney Houston's cover of I Will Always Love You, Calvin Harris, Marvin Gaye and Chris Stapleton.

Background and release
After the success of the lead single Sexy Song taken from her fourth studio album Rated Love, Wyatt uploaded a cover music video of Mary J. Blige's version of "I'm Goin' Down" to her YouTube channel, announcing a series of covers titled "Keke Covers" on January 28, 2016. On February 2, 2016, in the fourth anniversary passing of Whitney Houston Wyatt released her second cover video covering "I Will Always Love You" paying a tribute to the singer. On March 1, 2016, a cover of Beyoncé's "Love On Top" was released to Wyatt's YouTube channel. On March 15, 2016, a cover of "Diamonds" by Rihanna was uploaded.

On April 12, 2016, Wyatt uploaded a cover of Jeremih's "Oui", a remix version featuring both Wyatt and Jeremih's vocals was uploaded on May 16, 2016. Following the death of Prince, Wyatt uploaded a cover of "Diamonds and Pearls" on May 2, 2016 paying homage to the late singer. Wyatt uploaded a cover of Zayn's "Pillowtalk" on May 31, 2016. On June 29, 2016, a cover of "Tennessee Whiskey" by Chris Stapleton originally by David Allen Coe was released to her YouTube account. On July 27, 2016, an acoustic version of Marvin Gaye's "What's Going On" featuring brother Keever West was released. It was announced on January 31, 2017, via Wyatt's social media accounts that a covers album would be released, "My YouTube cover series #kekecovers comes the cover album 'Keke Covers' #COMINGSOON #FEB14 #LOVERSDAY2017". On February 14, 2017, the album was released through digital markets and streaming services worldwide via iTunes, Amazon, Google Play, Spotify and Tidal. A music video for This Is What You Came For was uploaded to Wyatt's YouTube channel on the day of the album's release.

Track listing

Release history

References

2017 albums
Keke Wyatt albums